Bullet is a 1996 American crime drama film directed by Julien Temple and starring Mickey Rourke, Tupac Shakur, Donnie Wahlberg, Adrien Brody, Ted Levine, John Enos III, and featuring early appearances by Peter Dinklage and Michael K. Williams. The screenplay was written by Bruce Rubenstein and Rourke, under the pseudonym 'Sir' Eddie Cook. Mickey Rourke was also the music supervisor of the film.

The film was shot in New York City in 1994 with a significant portion done in Brooklyn. The film’s release was delayed by over two years and it ended up having limited distribution in the United States in October 1996, a month after the death of Tupac Shakur. It was released direct to video worldwide.

Plot
Thirty-five-year-old Jewish-American convict and junkie Butch "Bullet" Stein (Mickey Rourke) is released from prison on parole after serving an 8-year sentence for being an accomplice to a robbery, perpetrated by his friend, Irish-American gangster Paddy. After his release, Bullet and his best friend Lester (John Enos III) rob two teenagers for drugs.

He also robs drug runner Flaco (Manny Pérez) and stabs him in the eye, telling him to notify his boss Tank (Tupac Shakur) of Bullet's return. He returns to Brooklyn to live with his dysfunctional family, including his alcoholic father, depressed mother and his two brothers, the older mentally unstable Vietnam veteran Louis (Ted Levine), and his younger brother Ruby (Adrien Brody), an aspiring graffiti artist.

Tank is a local drug kingpin with a score to settle after Bullet stabbed him in the eye while they were serving time together. Bullet seems to welcome the challenge. Tank first pressures Paddy to find and deliver Bullet to him. Later, he tries to have him killed by having one of Paddy's dealers sell Bullet drugs laced with poison. This fails when the drug spot is robbed by gunmen, one of whom proceeds to stab Ruby through the hand with a knife.

Throughout the film, Bullet keeps himself occupied by shooting heroin and robbing his neighbor's house for jewelry, which he and Lester sell to an Italian-American gangster named "Frankie Eyelashes" (Larry Romano). He also encourages Ruby to follow his artistic dreams and has a deep friend-to-friend talk with Lester over Lester's potential closeted homosexuality because of his mother abandoning him and his father's passing when he was a child, but he denies it.

After the first failed attempt to kill Bullet, Tank gets one of his henchmen to start a fight with Bullet, which is witnessed by Louis and ends in a draw when the henchman breaks his hand. Paddy figures out Tank's attempt to kill Bullet and that he is trying to play him and his associates against one another. He and his henchman Big Balls (Donnie Wahlberg) confront Tank about it, proceeding to kill two of his henchmen, including High Top (Michael K. Williams).

Bullet briefly returns home and apologizes to his mother for everything he put her through over the years. He later goes to a nightclub with Ruby and Lester. Paddy tries to help him escape because Tank is on the way to kill him. Bullet then accepts his fate when he is cornered by Tank and his men and has a final showdown with Tank, who shoots him dead, horrifying Ruby.

Soon after Bullet's funeral, Louis gets revenge by sneaking up on an unsuspecting Tank as he tries to enter his club and proceeding to cut Tank's throat, killing him. Louis then leaves Bullet's pet rat (named after Tony Curtis) on the corpse, exclaiming "Payback's a motherfucker" (a line which Tank said to Bullet when he had his henchman battle Bullet). The film ends with Louis watching Bullet's rat prepare to feast on Tank's corpse.

Cast
 Mickey Rourke as Butch "Bullet" Stein
 Tupac Shakur as "Tank"
 Adrien Brody as Reuben "Ruby" Stein
 Ted Levine as Louis Stein
 Matthew Powers as Paddy
 Donnie Wahlberg as "Big Balls"
 Suzanne Shepherd as "Cookie" Stein
 Jerry Grayson as Sol Stein
 Manny Pérez as "Flaco"
 Gina Figueroa as Laura
 John Enos III as Lester
 Gene Canfield as Reiner
 Michael K. Williams as "High Top"
 Big Stretch/Randy Walker as Dallas
 Peter Dinklage as Building Manager
 Jermaine Hopkins as "Pudgy"

See also 
 List of hood films

References

External links
 
 

1990s crime drama films
1996 films
American crime drama films
Films directed by Julien Temple
New Line Cinema films
Village Roadshow Pictures films
1996 drama films
Films about heroin addiction
1990s English-language films
1990s American films